Sunil Jogi is an Indian author. He is a poet of comic verses and the ex-president of  the Hindustani Academy, a post holding the rank of a Minister of State in the Government of Uttar Pradesh. He is also a Hindi adviser to the Ministry of Railways & Parliamentary Affairs.

Life
Born on 1 January 1971, Jogi obtained his masters and doctoral degrees in Hindi. literature He is the author of over 100 books and is the president of MAA Foundation, New Delhi, a nonprofit organization promoting sustainable education in rural areas. Jogi was honored by the Government of India in 2015 with Padma Shri, the fourth highest Indian civilian award.

References

Further reading

External links
 
 
 

Recipients of the Padma Shri in literature & education
Living people
1971 births
Indian male poets
Hindi-language poets
People from Kanpur
Poets from Uttar Pradesh
21st-century Indian poets
21st-century Indian male writers